Alessandra Basso (born 14 March 1967 in Treviso) is an Italian lawyer and politician who was elected as a member of the European Parliament in 2019.

References

1967 births
Living people
MEPs for Italy 2019–2024
21st-century women MEPs for Italy
Lega Nord MEPs
People from Treviso
University of Bologna alumni